Dmytro Danylenko (born 24 June 1999) is a Ukrainian sprint canoer. He is 2021 World Champion and bronze medallist of the 2022 World Championships. He is also a silver medalists of the 2021 European Championships in pair with Oleh Kukharyk.

References

External links

Ukrainian male canoeists
Living people
1999 births
European Games competitors for Ukraine
Canoeists at the 2019 European Games
ICF Canoe Sprint World Championships medalists in kayak
21st-century Ukrainian people